Binga FC is a Malian football club based in Bamako. They play in the Malien Division 1.

History 
Binga FC reached the final of the 2021 Malian Cup, losing 3-2 to Stade Malien. However, they qualified for the 2021–22 CAF Confederation Cup as Stade Malien  won the league, thus qualifying for the 2021–22 CAF Champions League.

In their first season in African competition, they defeated MC Breweries of Liberia in the first round, and ASFA Yennenga Burkina Faso of Burkina Faso in the second round. The club could not afford to fly, so travelled over 1300km by minibus to both countries.

They are drawn against Zambian club Zanaco in the 3rd round, with the fixture in doubt due to the logistical challenges resulting from Binga's lack of funds. With the 1st leg in Zambia scheduled for 28 November, and the 2nd leg in Mali on 5 December, travelling by road would entail a round trip of 15,000km and would prove a challenging obstacle.

Honours
 Malien Cup:
 2021 (finalist)

League and cup history

Performance in CAF competitions

References

Football clubs in Mali
Sport in Bamako